Adam Michael Bravin, also known as DJ Adam 12, is a musician and producer  who is half of the darkwave duo She Wants Revenge. He has also played in Crazy Town from 1995 to 1996, prior to DJ AM. After She Wants Revenge, Bravin started working on his own solo project, Love Ecstasy Terror. He has also been the personal DJ for President Barack Obama.

Biography
Bravin grew up with his parents listening to artists such as Stevie Wonder, The Beatles, and Led Zeppelin. He began DJing at the age of 16, primarily at local house parties in the San Fernando Valley. After a few years of spinning, Bravin began attending an LA nightclub owned by Prince. After about a year, Bravin was hired by Prince to DJ at the club. Bravin plays bass guitar, keyboards, guitar, drum machine, and percussion, in addition to programming and vocals as well as video production.

Controversy
In 2015 alongside his friend and business partner Michael Patterson, Bravin created the goth oriented club Cloak & Dagger, he acted as creative director and DJ. The club operated Tuesdays at the Pig ’N Whistle in Los Angeles, California. In June 2020 the club was closed amidst allegations of sexual misconduct, sexual harassment and discriminatory treatment against people of color.

References

American alternative rock musicians
Living people
Musicians from Los Angeles
Year of birth missing (living people)